Acrocercops calycophthalma is a moth of the family Gracillariidae, known from Maharashtra and Karnataka, India.

The hostplant for the species is Terminalia bellirica. They mine the leaves of their host plant. The mine has the form of a blotch mine under the upper cuticle of the leaves. There may be up to seven larvae feeding in one mine.

References

calycophthalma
Moths of Asia
Moths described in 1926